Mohammad Shams Langeroodi (born November 17, 1950) is one of the most celebrated contemporary Iranian poet, actor, singer, author and university lecturer. He has researched extensively on different periods of Persian poetry, most famous of which has resulted in the book named An Analytic History of Persian Modern Poetry in four volumes. He is currently in the process of publishing his second novel.

Life and early works

Shams Langeroodi was born in Langerood, Gilan, Iran as Mohammad Taghi Javaheri Gilani. Later his father changed their last name to Shams.
He published his first poetry book in 1976, but it wasn't until the 1980s that he established himself as one of the major poets of that decade when his poetry gained attention due to its novel imagery and surreal elements.
He currently lives in Tehran, Iran and is also the editor of Ahang-e Digar publications along with Hafez Mousavi and Shahab Mogharabin.

An Analytic History of Persian Modern Poetry
Published in 1998 in four volumes, An Analytic History of Persian Modern Poetry was the first extensive research work done on the contemporary Persian poetry. It starts from 1905 and goes year by year describing the events in Iran's political and social scenes, poetry and criticism conditions, literary magazines and poetry books published each year along with selected reviews including a brief review by the author up until 1979. In order to focus on research Shams Langeroodi did not publish any poetry book for 10 years.

Recent works
In his recent works, Shams Langeroodi has shown interest in a more simplistic approach to language. While imagery still plays a major part, simplicity and sarcasm are the new elements in his work that is engaged with Iran's social condition. 

It includes elements from mythology and religion to pop culture. An example to this is "Poem 36" from Gardener of Hell (2006).
You are late Moses!
The miracle era has passed
Grant your cane to Charlie Chaplin
So we have some laughs

Bibliography

Poetry
(رفتار تشنگی) Raftaar-e Teshnegi, 1976
(در مهتابی دنیا) Dar Mahtaabi-e Donya, 1984
(خاکستر و بانو) Khaakestar o Baanoo, 1986
(جشن ناپیدا) Jashne Naapeyda, 1988
(قصیده لبخند چاک چاک) Ghasideye Labkhand-e Chaak Chaak, 1990
(نت‌های برای بلبل چوبی) Notes For A Wooden Nightingle, 2000
(پنجاه و سه ترانه عاشقانه) Fifty Three Lovesongs, 2004
(باغبان جهنم) Gardener of Hell, 2006
(ملاح خیابان‌ها) Sailor of the Streets, 2008

Films 
(فلامینگو شماره ۱۳ ) Flamingo Number 13, 2010
(احتمال باران اسیدی) Risk of Acid Rain, 2015
(دوباره زندگی) Life Again, 2018

Research works
(گردباد شور جنون) Gerdbaade Shoor-e Jonoon (Hindi Style and Kalim Kaashaani), 1986
(مکتب بازگشت) Maktab-e Baazgasht (Research on history and poetry of Afsharids, Zand and Qajar eras), 1993
(تاریخ تحلیلی شعر نو) An Analytic History of Persian Modern Poetry (1905–1979) (in 4 Volumes), 1998
(از جان گذشته به مقصود می‌رسد) Az Jaan Gozashte Be Maghsood Miresad (On Nima Yooshij), 2001

Novels
(رژه بر خاک پوک) Reje Bar Khaak-e Pook, 1991
(شکست‌خوردگان را چه کسی دوست دارد) Who Likes the Defeated Ones?, 2008 (not yet published)

Essays
(از دیگران شنیدن و از خود گفتن) Az Digaraan Shenidan o Az Khod Goftan, (not yet published)

Interviews
(بازتاب زندگی ناتمام) Baaztaab-e Zendegi-e Naatamaam, 2007

See also

List of Persian poets and authors

References

External links
Shams Langeroodi's Weblog
English translation of Shams Langeroodi's short poems
Interview with BBC Persian
Interview about crisis in Persian poetry (in English)
Interview in Persian

20th-century Iranian poets
1950 births
Living people
People from Gilan Province
21st-century Iranian poets